The 1950 North Dakota gubernatorial election was held on November 7, 1950. Republican nominee Norman Brunsdale defeated Democratic nominee Clyde G. Byerly with 66.29% of the vote.

Primary elections
Primary elections were held on June 27, 1950.

Democratic primary

Candidates
Clyde G. Byerly, former Mayor of Mandan
Obed A. Wyum

Results

Republican primary

Candidates
Norman Brunsdale, State Senator
Frank Vogel, Manager of the Bank of North Dakota

Results

General election

Candidates
Norman Brunsdale, Republican 
Clyde G. Byerly, Democratic

Results

References

1950
North Dakota
Gubernatorial
November 1950 events in the United States